Murino may refer to:

People
 Caterina Murino, an Italian actress

Places
 Murino, Leningrad Oblast, a town in Russia
 Murino, Plav, a village in Montenegro

See also
 Battle of Murino
 Egidius de Francia, also known as Egidius de Murino
 Zun-Murino